E(a)rnest (or Ernie) Brown(e) may refer to:

Politicians
Ernest Brown (British politician) (1881–1962), British politician
Ernest M. Brown (1890–1961), member of the Legislative Assembly of Alberta
Ernest S. Brown (1903–1965), U.S. Senator from Nevada
Earnest Brown Jr. (born 1970), American jurist and politician in Arkansas

Sportspeople
Ernest Brown (basketball) (born 1979), American basketball player
Ernest Brown (coach) (1872–1905), American football player and coach with the Georgia Bulldogs
Ernie Brown (American football) (born 1971), American football defensive end
Earnest Brown IV (born 1999), American football defensive end

Others
Ernest Brown (dancer) (1916–2009), African American tap dancer
Ernest William Brown (1866–1938), British mathematician and astronomer
Ernie Lively (Ernest Wilson Brown Jr., 1947–2021), American actor